N31 may refer to
 N31 (Long Island bus)
 Kutztown Airport, in Berks County, Pennsylvania, United States
 London Buses route N31

Roads 
 N31 road (Belgium), a National Road in Belgium
 Route nationale 31, in France
 N31 road (Ireland) 
 Nebraska Highway 31, in the United States